Matthew Hurlow-Paonessa (born July 17, 1994) is an American soccer player who played as a forward for Phoenix Rising FC in the USL.

Career

College & Amateur
Hurlow-Paonessa played four years of college soccer at Chico State University between 2012 and 2015. After college, Hurlow-Paonessa played with USL PDL side San Diego Zest.

Professional
Hurlow-Paonessa signed with United Soccer League club Phoenix Rising on December 16, 2017. 

Hurlow-Panoessa's contract with National Independent Soccer Association club San Diego 1904 FC was in 2021. Hurlow is currently a free agent.

While at Phoenix Rising FC, Hurlow played alongside Didier Drogba, Omar Bravo and Shaun Write-Phillips. 

Hurlow is on trial in Sweden with BBK Bodens in Boden Sweden.(02/10/2023)

References

1994 births
Living people
American soccer players
Chico State Wildcats men's soccer players
San Diego Zest players
Phoenix Rising FC players
Association football forwards
Soccer players from California
USL League Two players
USL Championship players
National Independent Soccer Association players
FC Golden State Force players
San Francisco City FC players